= Delos, Virginia =

Unincorporated community in Virginia, United States

Coordinates: 38°05′47″N 77°16′19″W

Delos is an unincorporated community in Caroline County, in the U.S. state of Virginia.
